General José Federico Alberto de Jesús Tinoco Granados (21 November 1868 – 7 September 1931) was a politician, soldier, and the Dictator of Costa Rica from 1917 to 1919.

Biography 
Tinoco was born in 1868. On 5 June 1898 in San José, he married María de las Mercedes Elodia Fernández Le Cappellain. The couple had no children.

After a career in the army, he was appointed Minister of War in the cabinet of President Alfredo González. On 27 January 1917 he and his brother José Joaquín seized power in a coup d'état and established a repressive military dictatorship that attempted to crush all opposition. Though his government won support from the upper classes because it turned back the austerity measures adopted by President González, and declared war on the German Empire in May 1918, it failed to win the recognition of the United States, where President Woodrow Wilson supported the deposed government.

Popular sentiment against Tinoco, which began on 13 June 1919, quickly came to a head, and his brother was assassinated in early August. On August 13 Tinoco resigned in favor of Juan Bautista Quirós and went into exile in Europe. He died in Paris in 1931.

Due to a dispute over the legitimacy of the government of Tinoco, Costa Rica was not a party to the Treaty of Versailles and did not unilaterally end the state of war between itself and Germany. The technical state of war ended after World War II only after they were included in the Potsdam Agreement. Costa Rica did issue a declaration of war against Germany again on 11 August 1941.

References

Tinoco Granados, Federico
Tinoco Granados, Federico
People from San José, Costa Rica
Tinoco Granados, Federico
Costa Rican liberals